Wang Yifan (born 2 February 1999) is a Chinese footballer currently playing as a forward for Henan Jianye.

Club career
Wang Yifan was promoted to the senior team of Henan Jianye within the 2019 Chinese Super League season and would make his debut in league game on 9 March 2019 against Shandong Luneng Taishan F.C. in a 2-2 draw where he came on as a substitute for Yang Kuo.

Career statistics

References

External links

1999 births
Living people
Chinese footballers
Association football forwards
Chinese Super League players
Henan Songshan Longmen F.C. players